Jayy Randhawa is an Indian singer, actor and television presenter associated with Punjabi Music and Punjabi cinema. He started his career as TV presenter with "Tashan Da Pegg" on channel 9X Tashan. He is well known for his movie "Shooter (2022 film)".

Career

As Televesion Presenter 
Jayy Randhawa first recogonized after auditioning for the reality show MTV Stuntmania in 2010 which gave him huge popularity.In 2012,he started his first TV show "Tashan Da Pegg" on channel 9X Tashan from which he gained huge popularity.

As singer 
Jayy Randhawa released his first song "Theth Gabhru" in 2016 which was huge hit in Punjabi Music Industry.

As actor 
Jayy Randhawa got his breakthrough with the movie "Shooter (2022 film) which was banned earlier but released after 2 years of ban and got huge success in theatres.

Discography

Filmography

Tv Shows

References

External links 
 

Living people
1991 births
Indian singers
Actors from Punjab, India